Robert Michael Kennedy (September 16, 1928 – July 5, 1991) was a professional American football defensive back and halfback in the All-America Football Conference for the Los Angeles Dons.  He played college football at the University of North Carolina at Chapel Hill and was drafted in the eighth round of the 1949 NFL draft by the Washington Redskins.

References

1928 births
1991 deaths
American football defensive backs
American football running backs
Los Angeles Dons players
North Carolina Tar Heels football players
People from Weehawken, New Jersey
Players of American football from New Jersey